Dryden is an unincorporated village in the town of Wilton, Franklin County, Maine, United States. Dryden has a post office with ZIP code 04225, which opened on January 30, 1899.

References

Villages in Franklin County, Maine
Villages in Maine